This article lists events that occurred during 1985 in Estonia.

Incumbents

Events
Estonian Song Festival in Tallinn.

Births
17 April – Maiken Pius, actress

Deaths

See also
 1985 in Estonian television

References

 
1980s in Estonia
Estonia
Estonia
Years of the 20th century in Estonia